The Battle of Khanwa was fought at Khanwa on March 16, 1527. It was fought between the invading Timurid forces of Babur and the Rajput confederacy led by Rana Sanga for suprermacy of Northern India. The battle was a major event in Medieval Indian history although Timurids won at Panipat but at the time, the sultanate at Delhi was a spent force that was long crumbling. To the contrary  Mewar kingdom, under the able rule of Rana Sanga, had turned into one of the strongest powers of northern India. Therefore the battle was among the most decisive battles in the Mughal conquest of northern India.

It was among the earliest battles in Northern India where gunpowder was used to a great extent. The battle resulted in heavy casualties for both Timurids and Rajputs.

Background
Until 1524, Babur's aim was to expand his rule to Punjab, primarily to fulfil the legacy of his ancestor Timur, since it used to be part of his empire. Large parts of north India were under the rule of Ibrahim Lodi of the Lodi dynasty, but the empire was crumbling and there were many defectors. Babur had already raided Punjab in 1504 and 1518. In 1519 he tried to invade Punjab but had to return to Kabul due to complications there. In 1520–21 Babur again ventured to conquer Punjab, he easily captured Bhira and Sialkot which were known as the "twin gateways to Hindustan". Babur was able to annex towns and cities till Lahore but was again forced to stop due to rebellions in Qandhar. In 1523 he received invitations from Daulat Khan Lodi, Governor of Punjab and Ala-ud-Din, Ibrahim's uncle, to invade the Delhi Sultanate. Daulat Khan later betrayed Babur and with a force of 40,000 he captured Sialkot from the Mughal garrison and marched towards Lahore. Daulat Khan was soundly defeated at Lahore and through this victory Babur became the unopposed lord of Punjab., Babur continued his conquest and annihilated the Lodi sultanate's army in the First Battle of Panipat, where he killed the Sultan and founded the Mughal Empire.

According to Baburnama, Rana Sanga had also offered to help Babur against Ibrahim, however while Babur did attack Lodi and take over Delhi and Agra, Sanga made no move, apparently having changed his mind. Babur had resented this backsliding; in his autobiography, Babur accuses Rana Sanga of breaching their agreement. However Rajput sources claim the opposite and say that Sanga was successful against the Lodi Empire and did not require Baburs aid. Instead it was Babur who approached Rana Sanga and proposed an alliance against the Lodi Empire. Historian Satish Chandra speculates that Sanga may have imagined a long, drawn-out struggle taking place between Babur and Lodi, following which he would be able to take control of the regions he coveted. Alternatively, writes Chandra, Sanga may have thought that in the event of a Mughal victory, Babur would withdraw from Delhi and Agra, like Timur, once he had seized the treasures of these cities. Once he realized that Babur intended to stay on in India, Sanga proceeded to build a grand coalition that would either force Babur out of India or confine him to Afghanistan. In early 1527, Babur started receiving reports of Sanga's advance towards Agra.

According to Jadunath Sarkar, Babur did not need an invitation to invade Hindustan. After establishing himself in Kabul, Babur had started making inroads into Punjab which was governed by Daulat Khan Lodi, a courtier of Ibrahim Lodi. Daulat was unfaithful to his lord and formed an alliance with Babur against the Lodi Empire. This made it easy for Babur to enter Hindustan and oust both Daulat and Ibrahim.

However, Indologist Gopinath Sharma who is well known for his scholarly work on Mewar Kings and Mughal Empire ably rejected this theory of Rana Sanga sending his ambassador to Babur by providing various factual contemporary evidences for the same. Sharma added that Sanga already established himself as the most powerful Hindu king of Northern India of that time, while Babur was yet to establish his reputation in India. Under those circumstances it was in Babur's interest to seek an alliance with perhaps his greatest and most powerful enemy of Northern India. Also Babur gave no details of his alliance with Sanga while elsewhere he had provided details of his agreement with Daulat khan and Alam khan Lodhi. Baburnama itself was not a reliable book as it exaggerated many accounts like he did about number of armies in First Battle of Panipat to over glorify his victory which are too exaggerated in the context of modern researches.

The most important aspect of all is that there are no contemporary Hindu or Muslim writer who mentioned Sanga sending an ambassador to Kabul while all of them do that for Lodhi's. Therefore In Sharma's words It was a pity that all later writers have uncritically accepted Babur's version.

Initial skirmishes

After the First Battle of Panipat, Babur had recognized that his primary threat came from two allied quarters: Rana Sanga and the Afghans ruling eastern India at the time. In a council that Babur called, it was decided that the Afghans represented the bigger threat, and consequently Humayun was sent at the head of an army to fight the Afghans in the east. However, upon hearing of Rana Sanga's advancement on Agra, Humayun was hastily recalled. Military detachments were then sent by Babur to conquer Dholpur, Gwaliar, and Bayana, strong forts forming the outer boundaries of Agra. The commanders of Dholpur and Gwalior surrendered their forts to Babur, accepting his generous terms. However, Nizam Khan, the commander of Bayana, opened negotiations with both Babur and Sanga. The force sent by Babur to Bayana was defeated and dispersed by Rana Sanga on 21 February 1527.

In one of the earliest western scholarly account of the Mughal rulers, 'A History of India Under the Two First Sovereigns of the House of Taimur Baber and Humayun', William Erskine, a 19th-century Scottish historian, quotes:

Rana Sanga had destroyed all the Mughal contingents that were sent against him, this caused great fear in Babur's army as he has written "the fierceness and valour of the pagan army" made the troops "anxious and afraid". The Afghans in Baburs army started to leave and the Turks started complaining about defending a land that they hated, they requested Babur to leave to Kabul with the rich spoils that they had collected. Babur writes "no manly word or brave council was heard from any one soever".

Prelude
Rana Sanga had built a formidable military alliance against Babur. He was joined by virtually all the leading Rajput kings from Rajasthan, including those from Harauti, Jalor, Sirohi, Dungarpur, and Dhundhar. Rao Ganga of Marwar did not join personally but sent a contingent on his behalf led by his son Maldev Rathore. Rao Medini Rai of Chanderi in Malwa also joined the alliance. Further, Mahmud Lodi, the younger son of Sikandar Lodi, whom the Afghans had proclaimed their new sultan also joined the alliance with a contingent of Afghan horsemen with him. Khanzada Hasan Khan Mewati, the ruler of Mewat, also joined the alliance with his men. Babur denounced the Afghans who joined the alliance against him as kafirs and murtads (those who had apostatized from Islam). Chandra also argues that the alliance weaved together by Sanga represented a Rajput-Afghan alliance with the proclaimed mission of expelling Babur and restoring the Lodi empire. Rajasthan Indologist Dasharatha Sharma noted that Ibrahim's brother Mahmmud Lodhi went to Chittor with his small faction and asked for Sanga's assistance and Sanga in chivalrous manner agree for the purposal. Sharma further commented that this small factions of Afghan does not represented any united military pact but instead the pitty state of remaining disintigerated pact of Afghans at time who already witnessed the consequences of joining Babur as they did in Sack of Bayana where several of them were slaughtered. Sharma further explained that this small Afghan contingent along with Mahmmud fled from the battlefield of Khanua amidst the battle.

According to K.V Krishna Rao, Rana Sanga wanted to overthrow Babur, because he considered him to be a foreigner ruling in India and also to extend his territories by annexing Delhi and Agra, the Rana was supported by some Afghan chieftains who felt that Babur had been deceptive towards them.

According to Babur, Rana Sanga's army consisted of 200,000 soldiers. However, according to Alexander Kinloch, this is an exaggeration as the Rajput army did not exceed 40,000 men during the campaign in Gujarat. Even if this figure is exaggerated, Chandra comments that it is indisputable that Sanga's army greatly outnumbered Babur's forces. The greater numbers and reported courage of the Rajputs served to instil fear in Babur's army. An astrologer added to the general unease by his foolish predictions. To raise the flagging morale of his soldiers, Babur gave a religious colour to the battle against Hindus. Babur proceeded to renounce future consumption of wine, broke his drinking cups, poured out all the stores of liquor on the ground and promulgated a pledge of total abstinence. In his autobiography, Babur writes that: 

Babur knew that his army would have been swept by the Rajput charge if he tried to fight them in the open, he therefore planned a defensive strategy to form a fortified encampment where he would use his muskets and artillery to weaken his foes and then strike when their morale had shattered. Babur had carefully inspected the site. Like in Panipat, he strengthened his front by procuring carts that were fastened by iron chains (not leather straps, as at Panipat) and reinforced by mantlets. Gaps between the carts were used for horsemen to charge at the opponent at an opportune time. To lengthen the line, ropes made of rawhide were placed over wheeled wooden tripods. The flanks were given protection by digging ditches. Foot-musketeers, falconets and mortars were placed behind the carts, from where they could fire and, if required, advance. The heavy Turkic horsemen stood behind them, two contingents of elite horsemen were kept in the reserve for the taulqama (flanking) tactic. Thus, a strong offensive-defensive formation had been prepared by Babur.

Battle
Rana Sanga, fighting in a traditional manner, charged the Mughal ranks. His army was shot down in great numbers by the Mughal muskets, the noise of the muskets further caused fear amongst the horses and elephants of the Rajput army, causing them to trample their own men.  Rana Sanga finding it impossible to attack the Mughal centre, ordered his men to attack the Mughal flanks, the fighting continued on the two flanks for three hours, during which the Mughals fired at the Rajput ranks with muskets and arrows while the Rajputs could only retaliate in close quarters. 
Babur writes:

Babur did make attempts to use his famous taulqama or pincer movement, however his men were unable to complete it, twice they pushed the Rajputs back however due to the relentless attacks of the Rajput horsemen they were forced to retreat to their positions. At about this time Silhadi of Raisen deserted the Ranas army and went over to Baburs. The betrayal of Silhadi forced the Rana to change his plans and issue new orders. According to some historians this betrayal never happened and was a later concoction. During this time the Rana was shot by a bullet and fell unconscious, causing great confusion in the Rajput army and a lull in the fighting for a short period. Babur has written this event in his memoirs by saying "the accursed infidels remained confounded for one hour". A Jhala chieftain called Ajja acted as the Rana and led the Rajput army, while the Rana was hidden within a circle of his trusted men. Jhala Ajja proved to be a poor general, as he continued the attacks on the Mughal flanks while ignoring his weak centre. The Rajputs continued their attacks but failed to break the Mughal flanks  and their centre was unable to do anything against the fortified Mughal centre, Jadunath Sarkar has explained the struggle in the following words: 

Babur after noticing the weak Rajput centre ordered his men to take the offensive, the Mughal attack pushed the Rajputs back and forced the Rajput commanders to rush to the front, resulting in the death of many. The Rajputs were now leaderless as most of their senior commanders were dead and their unconscious king had been moved out of the battle. The Rajputs made a desperate charge on the Mughal left and right flanks like before, "here their bravest were mown down and the battle ended in their irretrievable defeat". The Rajputs and their allies had been defeated, dead bodies could be found as far as Bayana, Alwar and Mewat. The Mughals were too exhausted after the long fight to give chase and Babur himself gave up the idea of invading Mewar.

Following his victory, Babur ordered a tower of enemy skulls to be erected, a practice formulated by Timur. According to Chandra, the objective of constructing a tower of skulls was not just to record a great victory, but also to terrorize opponents. Earlier, the same tactic had been used by Babur against the Afghans of Bajaur.

Aftermath
The Battle of Khanwa demonstrated that Rajput bravery was not enough to counter Babur's superior generalship and organizational skills. Babur himself commented: 

Sanga was taken away from the battlefield in an unconscious state by Prithviraj Kachwaha and Maldev Rathore of Marwar. After regaining consciousness he took an oath to not return to Chittor until he had defeated Babur and ousted him. He also stopped wearing a turban and instead chose to wrap a cloth over his head. While he was preparing to wage another war against Babur , he was poisoned by his own nobles who did not want another conflict with Babur. He died in Kalpi on January 1528.

It is suggested that had it not been for the cannon of Babur, Rana Sanga might have achieved a Historic victory against Babur. Pradeep Barua notes that Babur's cannon put an end to outdated trends in Indian warfare.

See also
 Battles of Rajasthan
 First Battle of Panipat
 Battle of Ghaghra

Notes

References

Bibliography
 
 
 
 
 

Khanwa
Khanwa
Khanwa
Mewar
History of Rajasthan
Khanwa
1527 in India